Joseph R. Peterson (September 21, 1904 – August 26, 1967) was an American lawyer, farmer, and politician.

Peterson was born on a farm near Zearing, Illinois. In 1911, he moved to a farm near Dover, Illinois and then settled in Princeton, Illinois in 1930. Peterson went to the Bureau County public schools. In 1925, Peterson received his bachelor's degree from Beloit College. He then received his law degree from University of Illinois College of Law in 1928. He was admitted to the Illinois bar in 1928 and practiced law in Princeton, Illinois. He served as mayor of Dover, Illinois in 1929 and 1930. Peterson served as state's attorney of Bureau County from 1936 to 1948 and was a Republican. Peterson served in the Illinois House of Representatives from 1951 to 1956 and in the Illinois Senate from 1956 until his death in 1967. He died at his home in Princeton, Illinois.

Notes

External links

1904 births
1967 deaths
People from Princeton, Illinois
Beloit College alumni
University of Illinois College of Law alumni
Farmers from Illinois
Illinois lawyers
District attorneys in Illinois
Mayors of places in Illinois
Republican Party members of the Illinois House of Representatives
Republican Party Illinois state senators
20th-century American politicians
20th-century American lawyers